Bien (stylized as Bien:() is the first extended play by Spanish singer-songwriter and rapper C. Tangana. Written by Tangana and co-produced with Alizzz and some other usual collaborators, the EP was released on May 14, 2020 through Sony Music. Mainly composed during the COVID-19 pandemic national lockdown in Spain, the extended play shows Tangana's evolution to a more emo and melodic rap field. It spawned two singles prior to its release, "Nunca Estoy" and "Guille Asesino". The project was re-released for its vinyl edition on October 21 and included a new track "Ojalá" alongside Chico Blanco.

Track listing

Release history

References 

2020 EPs